Mount Islip is a  peak in the Angeles National Forest in California, United States. On a clear day the sharp, high peak provides impressive views of the Mojave Desert, the Los Angeles Basin, Santa Catalina Island, and San Clemente Island.

Another trailhead is at the Crystal Lake Recreation Area, north of Azusa.

Gallery

References

External links

 

Mountains of Los Angeles County, California
San Gabriel Mountains
Mountains of Southern California